The Mint of Finland is the national mint of Finland. It was established by Alexander II of Russia in 1860 as the markka became the official currency of the Grand Duchy of Finland. The mint was first located in the Katajanokka district of Helsinki and in 1988 the new production facility was opened in Vantaa. Mint of Finland has been a public limited company since 1993. Today it is the owner of the Swedish mint, the Myntverket, and owns half of the shares of the Royal Norwegian Mint.

The Mint of Finland has produced the euro coins of Estonia, Greece, Luxembourg, Slovenia, Cyprus and Republic of Ireland as well as the coins of the Swedish crown since 2008, which ended the more than thousand-year-old minting tradition in Sweden. Since 2017 it has also held the contract for minting coins of the Danish krone.

See also 
List of euro mints

References

External links 
Mint of Finland Official Homepage

Finland
Mints of Europe
1860 establishments in Finland
Economy of Finland
Manufacturing companies based in Helsinki
Ernst Lohrmann buildings